Rakshakan is a 2007 Indian Malayalam film, directed by Thulasidas, written by A. K. Santhosh, starring Kalabhavan Mani, Manya, Ashish Vidyarthi, Jagathy Sreekumar and Riyaz Khan in the lead roles.

Plot synopsis
Mukundan faces many challenges when he has to solve all his financial liabilities just with the income he gets by running a garage.

Cast
Kalabhavan Mani as Mechanic Mukundan
Manya as Aswathy 
Ashish Vidyarthi as C.I Sugathan
Sai Kumar as Professor Narendran	
Jagathy Sreekumar as S.I Karvarnan
K. P. A. C. Lalitha as Mukundan's and Sreekuttan's mother
Suja Karthika as Indu
Bindu Panicker as Dr. Arundhati Narendran
Harishree Ashokan as Podimon
Suraj Venjaramood as Kusumakumar
Geetha Salam as Lopez
Riyaz Khan as Vedimaram Zakeer
Abu Salim as Varghese
Manuraj as Manoj
Jayakrishnan Kichu as Sreekuttan
Kalasala Babu as Aswathy's father
Poornima Anand 
Jisna Ali as Heera Vishwanath
M. B. Padmakumar as Vijayan

References

External links

2007 films
2000s Malayalam-language films
Films directed by Thulasidas